Dieter Claessens (2 August 1921 in Berlin – 30 March 1997 in Berlin) was a German sociologist and anthropologist.

Life 
Returning as POW from the Soviet Union Dieter Claessens studied sociology, anthropology, and psychology in Berlin, where he got his doctorate (Dr. phil.) from the Freie Universität in 1957. He took his sociological post-doctoral degree (Habilitation) from the University of Münster, where he was called to a Chair of Sociology in 1962. 1966 he returned as professor to the Free University, and retired there 1986, continuing his research work until his death in Berlin, 1997.

He got his reputation especially for his pioneering work on the sociological dimension of both ontogenesis and phylogenesis.

Publications 
Status als entwicklungssoziologischer Begriff, 1965
(with Arno Klönne, Armin Tschoepe) Sozialkunde der Bundesrepublik Deutschland, 1965 (many editions)
Instinkt, Psyche, Geltung. Bestimmungsfaktoren menschlichen Verhaltens, 1966 (2. ed. 1970)
Familie und Wertsystem. Eine Studie zur zweiten sozio-kulturellen Geburt des Menschen, 1968 (4. ed. 1978, his basic study on ontogeny)
Rolle und Macht, 1968 (3. ed. 1974)
Nova Natura. Anthropologische Grundlagen des modernen Denkens, 1970
(with Karin Claessens) Kapitalismus als Kultur. Entstehung und Grundlagen der bürgerlichen Gesellschaft, 1973 
(with Karin Claessens, Baruta Schaller) Jugendlexikon, 1976 
Gruppen und Gruppenverbände. Systematische Einführung in die Folgen der Vergesellschaftung, 1977
Das Konkrete und das Abstrakte, 1980 (his basic study on phylogenesis)
(with Wanda von Baeyer-Katte) Gruppenprozesse. Analysen zum Terrorismus, 1982 
 (with Rainer Mackensen, eds.): Universalism Today, Contributions at the IInd International Symposium for Universalism (Berlin, August 22 to 26th, 1990), 1992,  & 
(with Daniel Tyradellis) Konkrete Soziologie. Verständliche Einführung in soziologisches Denken, 1997

On Dieter Claessens 
Biruta Schaller / Hermann Pfütze / Reinhart Wolff (Eds.): Schau unter jeden Stein. Merkwürdiges aus Kultur und Gesellschaft. Dieter Claessens zum 60. Geburtstag. Frankfurt on Main / Basel 1981

References

External links
 

German sociologists
1921 births
1997 deaths
Academic staff of the University of Münster
German male writers